Philadelphia Fever is an American women’s soccer club last playing in the Women's Premier Soccer League, the second tier of women’s soccer in the United States. The club was founded and joined the league in the Women's Premier Soccer League Elite inaugural season, before returning to the main WPSL for the 2013 WPSL season. After disbanding for 2014 and 2015, the Fever returned in the summer of 2016. The team's first season back was a development/exhibition year, looking to gather some interest and momentum before the Women's Arena Soccer League (WASL) kicks off in 2017. The WASL will be the women's equivalent of the American Soccer League (ASL), where the men's Philadelphia Fury compete. 

The aim for the new league, is to add another platform to Women's Soccer and to continue to bridge the gap between amateur and professional soccer. The Philadelphia Fever, along with AC Crusaders and Philadelphia Fury soccer clubs are part of the Atlantic Soccer Factory organization.

Year-by-year

External links
 http://www.asfsoccer.com

References

Association football clubs established in 2012
2012 establishments in Pennsylvania
Women's Premier Soccer League Elite teams
Women's Premier Soccer League teams
Women's sports in Pennsylvania